TAT-7 was the seventh transatlantic telephone cable, in operation from 1983 to 1994, initially carrying 4,000 3 kHz telephone circuits between New Jersey, United States and Porthcurno in southwest England. It was owned by AT&T, British Telecom and France Telecom.

Although optical fiber had been invented in 1970, this cable was still using coaxial cable technology.

References

Infrastructure completed in 1983
Transatlantic communications cables
United Kingdom–United States relations
AT&T buildings
British Telecom buildings and structures
Orange S.A.
1994 disestablishments in England
1983 establishments in England
1983 establishments in New Jersey
1994 disestablishments in New Jersey